Come On, Tarzan is a 1932 American pre-Code western film starring Ken Maynard, Merna Kennedy,  and Niles Welch. 

A ranch foreman at odds with his female boss, fights outlaws who are killing horses for dog food. First released on September 11, 1932, it was filmed in California in Hidden Valley, Ventura County and in Kernville, Kern County. It was produced by K.B.S. Productions Inc.

Cast
Ken Maynard as Ken Benson
Merna Kennedy as Pat Riley
Niles Welch as Steve Frazier
Roy Stewart as Butch - Henchman
Kate Campbell as Aunt Martha
Bob Kortman as Spike - Henchman
Nelson McDowell as Slim - Cowhand
Jack Rockwell as Sheriff

References

External links

1932 films
1932 Western (genre) films
American black-and-white films
Films directed by Alan James